The following is a list of ecoregions in Guinea Bissau, according to the Worldwide Fund for Nature (WWF).

Terrestrial ecoregions
Guinea-Bissau is in the Afrotropical realm. Ecoregions are listed by biome.

Tropical and subtropical grasslands, savannas, and shrublands

Guinean forest-savanna mosaic

Mangrove

Guinean mangroves

Freshwater ecoregions
By bioregion:

Nilo-Sudan
Senegal-Gambia

Upper Guinea
Northern Upper Guinea

Marine ecoregions

 Gulf of Guinea

References
 Burgess, Neil, Jennifer D’Amico Hales, Emma Underwood (2004). Terrestrial Ecoregions of Africa and Madagascar: A Conservation Assessment. Island Press, Washington DC.
 Spalding, Mark D., Helen E. Fox, Gerald R. Allen, Nick Davidson et al. "Marine Ecoregions of the World: A Bioregionalization of Coastal and Shelf Areas". Bioscience Vol. 57 No. 7, July/August 2007, pp. 573–583. 
 Thieme, Michelle L. (2005). Freshwater Ecoregions of Africa and Madagascar: A Conservation Assessment. Island Press, Washington DC.

Ecoregions of Guinea-Bissau
Guinea-Bissau geography-related lists
Guinea-Bissau